Jens Pauli Skaalum (December 18, 1893 – August 1, 1978) was a Faroese teacher and a politician for the Union Party. 

Skaalum was born in Hvalba, the son of the teacher and politician Óli Niklái Skaalum and Elsebeth Helena Niclasen. He graduated from the Jonstrup Normal School in Copenhagen as a primary school teacher in 1914, and then taught in Porkeri from 1914 to 1920 and in Hvalba from 1920 to 1960. He was married to Astrid Larsen from Porkeri.

Skaalum was a deputy representative to the Faroese Parliament from Suðuroy, and he stood in for Oliver Effersøe, who took a leave of absence due to health reasons from 1931 to 1932. Skaalum was a member of the Hvalba municipal council from 1939 to 1950 and served as mayor from 1939 to 1948. He was a member of the supervisory committee of the bank Føroya Sparikassi from 1957 to 1976.

References

Members of the Løgting
Faroese politicians
1893 births
1978 deaths